Pavlo Matsuyev (born 5 November 1990) is a Ukrainian sailor. He and Borys Shvets placed 25th in the men's 470 event at the 2016 Summer Olympics.

References

1990 births
Living people
Ukrainian male sailors (sport)
Olympic sailors of Ukraine
Sailors at the 2016 Summer Olympics – 470
21st-century Ukrainian people